Giovanni Chronicles is a series of adventure modules by White Wolf Publishing for their tabletop role-playing game Vampire: The Masquerade. The series spans four books: Giovanni Chronicles: The Last Supper (1995), Giovanni Chronicles II: Blood & Fire (1996), Giovanni Chronicles III: The Sun Has Set (1998), and Giovanni Chronicles IV: Nuova Malattia (1999).

Contents
Giovanni Chronicles II: Blood & Fire is an adventure set in the year 1666 in which the player characters become embroiled in the schemes of the Giovanni.

Production
The Last Supper was designed by Daniel Greenberg. The series was created for White Wolf's "Black Dog Game Factory" label.

The first two books were re-released in 2000 in the compilation Giovanni Saga I.

Reception
The series was popular among Vampire: The Masquerade players.

Andy Butcher reviewed Giovanni Chronicles II: Blood & Fire for Arcane magazine, rating it a 7 out of 10 overall. Butcher comments that "Blood & Fire has great potential, especially if the same group has previously played The Last Supper and the players reprise their previous roles."

Reviews
Rollespilsmagasinet Fønix (Danish) (Issue 10 - October/November 1995)
Envoyer (German) (Issue 45 - Jul 2000)

References

Role-playing game adventures
Role-playing game supplements introduced in 1995
Vampire: The Masquerade